The  Koshun worm snake (Argyrophis koshunensis) is a species of snake in the family Typhlopidae. It is endemic to Taiwan. Very little is known about this species known only from a small number of historical records; it is considered Data Deficient by IUCN.

References

Argyrophis
Reptiles of Taiwan
Endemic fauna of Taiwan
Reptiles described in 1916